Fog Bay may refer to;

Fog Bay, Antarctica
Fog Bay, a bay in Australia - refer Dundee Beach, Northern Territory
Fog Bay and Finniss River Floodplains, Northern Territory, Australia